Jawahar Navodaya Vidyalaya Saharanpur is an Indian school located in the Saharanpur district of Uttar Pradesh state. It is a part of gifted education system. It is situated on Badgaon road, 3 km from Ambehtachand, with a campus stretch of 36 acres. The current principal of the school is Mr. Mahendra Singh.

References

External links 

High schools and secondary schools in Uttar Pradesh
Education in Saharanpur
Jawahar Navodaya Vidyalayas in Uttar Pradesh
2001 establishments in Uttar Pradesh
Educational institutions established in 2001